Michael "Mike" Fournier (born November 24, 1971) is a Canadian curler originally from Sainte-Anne-de-Bellevue, Quebec. He currently skips his own team out of Toronto, Ontario.

Career
Fournier played in his first Quebec Tankard in 2014 at the 2014 Quebec Men's Provincial Curling Championship. His team reached the semifinal where they lost to eventual champions Jean-Michel Ménard. They made it one game further the following year at the 2015 Quebec Men's Provincial Curling Championship, losing in the final to the Ménard rink. Fournier won his first provincial championship at the 2018 WFG Tankard. His team qualified for the playoffs as the fourth seed and won three straight games to claim the provincial title. At the 2018 Tim Hortons Brier, Fournier led his team to a 3–5 record, finishing in tenth place. They could not defend their provincial title the following year, losing to Martin Crête in the final of the 2019 WFG Tankard.

Fournier and his team of Félix Asselin, William Dion and Jean-François Trépanier qualified for their first Grand Slam of Curling event during the 2019–20 season at the 2019 Tour Challenge Tier 2. The team qualified for the playoffs with a perfect 4–0 record. They then defeated Jamie Murphy in the quarterfinals before losing to eventual winners Korey Dropkin in the semifinal. Also during the 2019–20 season, they finished third at the 2020 Quebec Tankard.

Due to the COVID-19 pandemic in Quebec, the 2021 provincial championship was cancelled. Curling Québec then decided to appoint Team Fournier to represent Quebec at the 2021 Tim Hortons Brier in Calgary, Alberta. The event was played in a bio-secure bubble to prevent the spread of the virus. At the 2021 Brier, Fournier led Quebec to a 4–4 record, failing to qualify for the championship round.

In their first event of the 2021–22 season, Team Fournier reached the final of the Capital Curling Fall Open. Because of their previous successes on tour, the team had enough points to qualify for the 2021 Canadian Olympic Curling Pre-Trials. At the Pre-Trials, the team finished the round robin with a 3–3 record, missing the playoff round. Later in the season, they won the Challenge Casino de Charlevoix and reached the final of both the Stu Sells 1824 Halifax Classic and the Finale du Circuit. The Quebec Tankard was once again cancelled due to the pandemic and Team Fournier were named as the provinces representatives for the 2022 Tim Hortons Brier. At the Brier, the team finished once again with a 4–4, placing sixth in their pool. Following the season, Fournier moved to Ontario and formed a new team consisting of Kevin Flewwelling, Sean Harrison and Zander Elmes.

Aside from men's curling, Fournier has represented Quebec at three Canadian Mixed Curling Championships in 1997, 2013 and 2014. His best result was in 2013, where he skipped the Quebec team to a bronze medal finish.

Personal life
Fournier is employed as a pricing strategy manager at McDonald's Canada. He is married to Anne Morinville and has three kids.

Fournier moved to Toronto (East York) in 2022.

Teams

References

External links

1971 births
Living people
Canadian male curlers
Curlers from Quebec
People from Sainte-Anne-de-Bellevue, Quebec
Sportspeople from Montreal
People from Lachine, Quebec
Curlers from Toronto
20th-century Canadian people